Vehviläinen is a Finnish surname. Notable people with the surname include:

Ailamari Vehviläinen (born 1977), Finnish singer
Anu Vehviläinen (born 1963), Finnish politician
Ville Vehviläinen, Finnish musician

Finnish-language surnames